Aricanduva may refer to:
 Subprefecture of Aricanduva, São Paulo
 Aricanduva (district of São Paulo)
 Aricanduva, Minas Gerais
 Aricanduva River